The 1971–72 Magyar Kupa (English: Hungarian Cup) was the 32nd season of Hungary's annual knock-out cup football competition.

Final

See also
 1971–72 Nemzeti Bajnokság I

References

External links
 Official site 
 soccerway.com

1971–72 in Hungarian football
1971–72 domestic association football cups
1971-72